The Bajrakli Mosque is the main mosque situated in the center of the Bazaar of Peja. It was built in 1471 by Sultan Mehmed II and is an Ottoman-style single-domed mosque with the oldest and highest dome in the city. The mosque was burned twice once during World War II in 1943 by Italian forces when the Bazaar of Peja was completely burned down, and the second time by the Serbian military during the 1999 Kosovo War.

See also

List of mosques in Kosovo

Notes

References 

Religious buildings and structures in Peja
Ottoman mosques in Kosovo
Cultural heritage of Kosovo
Religious buildings and structures completed in 1471
15th-century mosques
Rebuilt buildings and structures
Cultural Monuments of Exceptional Importance (Serbia)